The Daensen folding chair consists of the metallic remains of a folding chair which were discovered in 1899 in sand from a Bronze Age tumulus near Daensen, a part of Buxtehude, Lower Saxony, Germany. The chair is the southernmost and most richly decorated example of the eighteen known folding chairs of the Nordic Bronze Age in Northern Europe. The fittings, along with a reconstruction, are in the permanent exhibition of the Archaeological Museum Hamburg in Harburg, Hamburg.

History 

In the centre of the mound Eickhoff's workers discovered a rectangular stone packing of boulders. Inside they found bones and a complete human skull. The workers gave the bones to a dog. Their work was witnessed by the Moisburg pastor Wittkopf who noted his observations in his Parishs book of accounts:

In 1899 sand was again removed from the mound again, and this time the workers discovered a second stone circle. In November 1899 Eickhoff forwarded a part of the fitting along with a ribbed armring of bronze to the museum. In 1934 the museum's director Willi Wegewitz acquired the remaining fittings from Eickhoff's sons, for the museum.

Findings 

The end caps are ribbed and their faces decorated with a pattern of four concentric circles. These components were attached to the frame of the seat. Most likely the stool had originally four of these knobs, the other two being presumed lost. There were also four bronze studs with gold plated heads. The gold plate was fixed by two fine incisions in the bronze fitting and then folded on the reverse. Furthermore, there are five rectangular fitting plates whose broken edges were put together. It is most likely that some of their fragments are still missing. Only a few organic components were preserved, one is a piece of leather, and there were seven or eight pieces of wood, one of ash, the other of maple. Among the pieces of wood, there is a corner piece and one with the mounting of the seat's leather. The remains of the  chair have been typologically dated to  1400 BC.

Reconstruction 

Compared to earlier previous finds from grave mounds and tree coffin burials in Denmark, Sweden, Schleswig-Holstein and Mecklenburg the present metal objects were identified as fitting parts of a folding chair typically for the Nordic Bronze Age. These numerous comparative findings in connection with the survived wooden structures of the Vamdrup folding chair found at Guldhøj in the Danish municipality of Ribe in 1891 allowed a precise reconstruction of the Daensen folding chair.

Interpretation 
Due to the improper excavation and documentation of the find, precise statements about the archaeological context are not possible. The chair is the most magnificent decorated folding chair of the Nordic Bronze Age. This type of chair, or their fittings is present in 17 comparable finds. The remains of two folding chair fittings originate from hoards, all the rest were grave goods from tree coffin or grave mound burials. Given the role of the stool in placing the sitter above others who are seated on the floor, it is possible that the individual buried in Daensen was a high-ranking person, a chieftain or religious official. The absence of further grave goods may indicate that the grave had been raided by antique grave robbers. Comparably equipped graves with folding chairs typically included additional offerings such as weapons, jewellery, and household items, which are absent in Daensen. The ribbed bronze arm bracelet provided by farmer Eickhoff to the museum must come from a female burial, supporting the interpretation of the burial of a religious leader. Similar folding chairs originate from Ancient Egypt, whose most famous specimen comes from Tutankhamun's tomb of 1330 BC, demonstrating the extensive international connections of the later Bronze Age.

Bibliography

References

External links 
 Matthias Schulz: Did Ancient Germans Steal the Pharaoh's Chair Design? on Spiegel Online 05/03/2012

This article has been translated in part from the German Wikipedia equivalent.

Nordic Bronze Age
Germanic archaeological artifacts
Bronze Age Germany
Archaeology of Schleswig-Holstein
Archäologisches Museum Hamburg
Archaeological artifacts
1899 archaeological discoveries
Portable furniture